ShotGrid is a project management software owned by Autodesk. ShotGrid is primarily used for visual effects and animation project management in television shows and movie production and video game development.

History

Founding of company
ShotGrid Software was originally founded as Shotgun Software, by Don Parker and Isaac Reuben in 2006. They created it to build a project management tool for Disney's The Wild. Originally, the product focussed primarily on production tracking and later added more functionalities.

The first version of Shotgun was released privately two weeks after the first code was written. Shotgun then spent three and half years in private beta. The product was launched publicly in 2009 at SIGGRAPH.

Merger with Autodesk
In June 2014, Shotgun was acquired by Autodesk. 

In 2017, Shotgun won a Engineering Emmy. 

In February 2020, Don Parker announced Sarah Hodges would be taking over as head of Shotgun. 

In February 2021, Don Parker and four other Shotgun employees were awarded Sci-Tech Oscars for the development of Shotgun in the Technical Achievement category.

Name change
In June 2021, Autodesk changed the name of the software to ShotGrid.

References

External links

Autodesk products
Autodesk acquisitions
Academy Award for Technical Achievement winners
Project management software